Joao Feliciano, Sr. (NicSon) (born January 22, 1946) is a contemporary Brazilian painter mostly known for his particular skills in palette knife (oil on canvas) painting. Also, one of the few autodidact impressionists alive whose art has reached commercial and critic success in Brazil.

External links
 Official Website 
 Nicson - Pintura em Movimento (Moringa Cultural) 
 E-Masterpieces - exclusive representative outside Brazil (USA)
 Nicson at the White Space Gallery (London)
 Julio Louzada, Official Brazilian Art Catalog (restricted access) 
 Nicson at the Arcoplex Itaguacu Grand Opening (Jornal "Diário Catarinense") 
 Shopping é "galeria" de Artista Plástico (Jornal "A Notícia") 
 Pintor de Shopping (Jornal "A Notícia") 

Brazilian painters
1946 births
Living people